During the 1917–18 Scottish football season, Celtic competed in the Scottish First Division.

Results

Scottish First Division

See also
 Navy and Army War Fund Shield

References

Celtic F.C. seasons
Celtic